William Ward (fl. 1553–1563) was an English politician.

Family
Nothing is known of Ward's years of birth and death, or of his family. There is no record of him after 1563. He is thought to be a different man from William Ward (MP for Lancaster), MP for Lancaster in 1547.

Career
He was a Member (MP) of the Parliament of England for Morpeth in Oct. 1553, April 1554, November 1554, 1559 and 1563, and for Carlisle in 1555.

References

Year of birth missing
Year of death missing
English MPs 1553 (Mary I)
English MPs 1554
English MPs 1554–1555
English MPs 1555
English MPs 1559
English MPs 1563–1567
Members of the Parliament of England (pre-1707) for Morpeth
Members of the Parliament of England (pre-1707) for Carlisle